Moonlight is an unincorporated community in Greensville County, Virginia, United States. It is located north of Emporia along US 301 approximately near the vicinity of Exits 12 and 13 off of Interstate 95.

References

Unincorporated communities in Greensville County, Virginia
Unincorporated communities in Virginia